School District 72 Campbell River is a school district on Vancouver Island in British Columbia. Centered in Campbell River it includes the more rural communities such as Sayward and the adjacent islands between Vancouver Island and mainland British Columbia.

Schools

See also
List of school districts in British Columbia

References

External links
Campbell River School District Website

Campbell River, British Columbia
72